, known professionally as , is a Japanese model, television personality, and singer. She is represented by Starray Production. She was once a member of Yoshimoto Creative Agency in Osaka.

Early life
Peco was born in Osaka Prefecture in 1995. She grew up in a wealthy family who runs a company of construction materials.
Peco entered as a seventh grader in the New Star Creation (NSC) Josei Tarento Course when she was in high school, where she had activities with Yoshimoto.
After graduating from high school in Tokyo, she began part-time work at an apparel shop in Harajuku, and later joined Starray Production

Career
In July 2010, Peco was elected as one of the PR Girls in Welcome TVs "Glico Giant Caprico PR Girls Audition".
In April 2011, she enrolled to NSC Josei Tarento Course.
In April 2012, Peco joined the Yoshimoto girl unit Tsubomi. When she joined Yoshimoto's Tsubomi she was active in the comic combination "Sakuranbo". They had an experience of entering the second preliminaries of the MBS Manzai Awards in 2012.
After graduating from Tsubomi Peco turned into a reader model, and renamed to her current stage name and appeared in Zipper and HR. She also served as an image girl in Tenshi no Tsubasa.
On 17 September 2014 Peco's started her music career with the single "Peco Ondo" in the name peco.
In September 2015, in the variety show Onna no Karada Atari Search Bangumi: Naze? Soko? she was introduced as Charisma Model Shitennō''' along with Nicole Fujita, Miyu Ikeda and Chisato Yoshiki. Later in the same month, Peco appeared in Gyōretsu no Dekiru Hōritsusōdansho alongside Ryucheru, and since then, they appeared together in various variety shows.
On 31 December 2016, she announced her marriage with Ryuchell.

In July 2018, they announced the birth of their son, named Link after Link Larkin from Hairspray''. On 25 August 2022, they announced on Instagram that they were legally separating after discussions over Ryuchell's gender roles. Their agencies confirmed that the two had gotten divorced while also continuing to live together.

Discography

Singles

Filmography

Film

TV programmes

Magazines

Stage

Animation

References

External links
 Official profile 
 

Living people
1995 births
People from Sakai, Osaka
Japanese female models